New Aberdour is a small planned village in the Aberdour parish of Aberdeenshire, Scotland, situated south of Aberdour Bay on the Moray Firth. One of the earliest churches in Scotland is said to have been founded here in 580 AD by Saint Drostan and Saint Columba.

In October 1797, William Gordon of Aberdour chose this high, exposed plateau for his "village upon an estate near the Kirk of Aberdour". He then invited "industrious tradesmen and labourers" to live there.

The Commercial Hotel was built, it is believed, in 1798. As of 2021, it is on Scotland's Buildings at Risk Register.

The harled parish church dates to 1818, designed by John Smith. It reuses the 1771 bellcote from the church of St Drostan in Aberdour.

During World War II, a German Heinkel HE115 crashed near a farm on Windyheads Hill. Local people assisted an injured airman. The story is documented in a 2018 book, North East Scotland at War - Events and Facts 1939-1945, which corrects the belief the aircraft came from Norway and ran out of fuel; it was actually from Germany and it crashed in bad weather.

See also
Aberdour House

References

External links

New Aberdour
St Drostan
St Drostan's Church, New Aberdour

Villages in Aberdeenshire